Pavel Havelka (born 1 July 1965) is a Czechoslovak sprint canoer who competed in the late 1980s. At the 1988 Summer Olympics in Seoul, he was eliminated in the semifinals of the K-2 500 m event.

References
 Sports-Reference.com profile

1965 births
Canoeists at the 1988 Summer Olympics
Czechoslovak male canoeists
Czech male canoeists
Living people
Olympic canoeists of Czechoslovakia
Canoeists from Prague